Daspalla is a Vidhan Sabha constituency of Nayagarh district, Odisha.

This constituency includes Daspalla block, Gania block and Nuagaon block.

Elected Members

Sixteen elections were held between 1951 and 2014 including one By election in 1960.
Elected members from the Daspalla constituency are:
2014: (121): Purna Chandra Nayak (BJD)
2009: (121): Kashinath Mallik (BJD)
2004: (64): Rudra Madhab Ray (Independent)
2000: (64): Harihar Karan (Congress)
1995: (64): Rudra Madhab Ray (Janata Dal)
1990: (64): Rudra Madhab Ray (Janata Dal)
1985: (64): Harihar Karan  (Congress)
1980: (64): Harihar Karan (Congress-I)
1977: (64): Harihar Karan (Congress)
1974: (64): Harihar Karan (Independent)
1971: (58): Saheb Naik (Congress)
1967: (58): B.Nayak (Swatantra Party)
1961: (82): Saheb Naik (Congress)
1960: (By-Poll): Rajabahadur Kishore Chandra Bhanj Deo (Congress)
1957: (55): Sridhar Naik (Communist Party of India)
1951: (95): Rajabahadur Kishore Chandra Bhanj Deo (Congress)

2019 Election Result

2014 Election Result
In 2014 election, Biju Janata Dal candidate Purna Chandra Nayak defeated Indian National Congress candidate Indumati Nayak by a margin of 57,327 votes.

2009 Election Result
In 2009 election, Biju Janata Dal candidate Kashinath Mallick defeated Indian National Congress candidate Lecturer Bullion by a margin of 38,758 votes.

Notes

References

Assembly constituencies of Odisha
Nayagarh district